Miladin Kozlina (born 11 February 1983) is a Slovenian handball player who plays for Wilhelmshavener HV.

References

1983 births
Living people
Sportspeople from Celje
Slovenian male handball players
Olympic handball players of Slovenia
Handball players at the 2004 Summer Olympics
Expatriate handball players
Slovenian expatriate sportspeople in Germany
Slovenian people of Serbian descent
21st-century Slovenian people